Distracted Snowflake Volume One is the fourth studio album by Bugskull, released in 1997 by Pop Secret.

Track listing

Personnel 
Adapted from the Distracted Snowflake Volume One liner notes.

Musicians
Brendan Bell – guitar (5), mixing
Sean Byrne (as Bügsküll) – lead vocals, guitar, mixing, photography
Mark Hansen – guitar (9, 12), bass guitar (6), Moog synthesizer (11), mixing
James Yu – congas (12), mixing

Production and additional personnel
Phil Quitslund – mixing
Tiffany Scott – mixing, photography

Release history

References

External links 
 

1997 albums
Bugskull albums